Sahawa (or Sahwa) is a village in the Taranagar sub-district of Churu district in the Indian state of Rajasthan. This place is famous for an historical Gurudwara.

Transportation
The nearest railhead is at Nohar and Bhadra, and the closest airport is at Jaipur. Sahwa is well connected by state highway to Sirsa, Hanumangarh and Churu.

Water supply
There is a water treatment plant at Sahwa, part of the Aapni-Yojna integrated water supply project serving northwestern Rajasthan. It supplies water to other cities near by it like Taranagar, Bhanin etc. It is one of largest water filtering plant in Rajasthan

References

Villages in Churu district